Big Shot may refer to:

Fiction
 Big Shot, an animated superhero character on the television show The Tick created by cartoonist Ben Edlund in 1986
 Big Shot, the former mascot of the Philadelphia 76ers until 1996
 Big Shot, a fictional TV show in the 1998 anime Cowboy Bebop
 Big Shot (TV series), an American television series developed by Dean Lorey and David E. Kelley
 Big Shot, an antagonist in the Marvel UK comic Death's Head
 The Big Shot (1922 film), a German silent film
 The Big Shot (1931 film), a pre-Code comedy directed by Ralph Murphy, starring Eddie Quillan and Maureen O'Sullivan
 The Big Shot (1937 film), a comedy directed by Edward Killy, starring Guy Kibbee and Cora Witherspoon
 The Big Shot (1942 film), an American film noir crime drama directed by Lewis Seiler, starring Humphrey Bogart and Irene Manning
 Big Shot Comics, a 1940s comic book series, an anthology title published by Columbia Comics
 Big Shot: Confessions of a Campus Bookie, a 2002 television film starring David Krumholtz
 Big Shots (film), a 1987 American comedy adventure film directed by Robert Mandel, starring Ricky Busker and Darius McCrary
 Big Shots (TV series), a 2007–2008 American television drama series
 "Big Shots" (CSI: Crime Scene Investigation), an episode of CSI: Crime Scene Investigation
 Diary of a Wimpy Kid: Big Shot, a 2021 children's novel by Jeff Kinney

Music
 "Big Shot", a song by the Bonzo Dog Doo-Dah Band from their 1967 album Gorilla
 "Big Shot" (song), a song by Billy Joel, from his 1978 album 52nd Street
 "Big Shot", a song by The Beat (The English Beat) from their 1980 album I Just Can't Stop It
 "Big Shot", a 2003 song by Kill Hannah
 Big Shots (album), a 2003 album by Charizma & Peanut Butter Wolf
 Big Shots Bonus EP, the 2004 follow-up by Charizma & Peanut Butter Wolf
 "Big Shot", a song by Drake Bell from his 2011 EP A Reminder
 "Big Shot", a song by Islander, the theme song of the Bound for Glory wrestling event
 "Big Shot", a song by Kendrick Lamar and Travis Scott from the Black Panther soundtrack
 "Big Shot", a song by the Lumineers for their album Brightside
 "BIG SHOT", a 2021 track by Toby Fox from Deltarune, Chapter 2

Photography
 Big Shot, a Polaroid instant camera manufactured from 1971 to 1973
 Bigshot (digital camera), a 2013 build-it-yourself digital camera designed for ages 8 to 14

Other
 Big Shot (ride), an amusement ride, opened 1996, on top of the Stratosphere Las Vegas tower
 Big Shot (pinball), a pinball machine created in 1973 by Gottlieb
 Big Shot, a New Orleans-based soda brand by National Beverage subsidiary Winnsboro Beverage Packers
 Big Shot, a 2013 episode of ESPN 30 for 30 documentary about the purchase and ownership of the National Hockey League's New York Islanders by John Spano
 Mr. Big Shot, nickname for American basketball player Chauncey Billups
 Frank Fisher (rugby league) (1905–1980), Australian player nicknamed "Big Shot"